Peter Vandy is a politician in Sierra Leone. He is a member of the Revolutionary United Front and ran alongside Pallo Bangura in the 2002 Presidential election. He is a former government Minister of Lands and Environment and was detained alongside other government ministers Pallo Bangura and Mike Lamin among others in 2000.

References

Year of birth missing (living people)
Living people
Revolutionary United Front politicians
Government ministers of Sierra Leone
Place of birth missing (living people)